Tótkomlós is a town in Békés County, Hungary.

Name 
Komlós means "(place) with hops" in Hungarian, while prefix Tót is the word for Slovaks in old Hungarian. Hops also can be found in the coat of arms of the town.

Geography 
Mezőtúr-Orosháza-Mezőhegyes railway line crosses the town.

History 
The Medieval village was ruined due to the Ottoman wars, native Hungarian population fled from the area. It was rebuilt after 1715 with Slovak settlers. Hungarians became the majority after the Czechoslovak-Hungarian population exchange.

People 
 János Jankó (1833–1896), Hungarian painter 
 Pál Závada (1954), Hungarian writer
 Gyurkovics Zsuzsa (1929), Hungarian actress

International relations

Twin towns — Sister cities
Tótkomlós is twinned with:
 Brețcu, Romania
 Galanta, Slovakia
 Jelšava, Slovakia
 Nădlac, Romania
 Neunkirchen am Brand, Germany
 Nové Zámky, Slovakia
 Zvolen, Slovakia

References

External links

  in Hungarian and Slovak

Populated places in Békés County
Slovak communities in Hungary